Vanda Vályi (born 13 August 1999) is a Hungarian water polo player. At the 2020 Summer Olympics she competed for the Hungary women's national water polo team in the women's tournament.

She won the Women's LEN Trophy in 2018 playing for Dunaújváros

References

External links
 

1999 births
Living people
Sportspeople from Eger
Hungarian female water polo players
Water polo players at the 2020 Summer Olympics
Medalists at the 2020 Summer Olympics
Olympic bronze medalists for Hungary in water polo
World Aquatics Championships medalists in water polo
21st-century Hungarian women